Novri Setiawan (born 11 November 1993) is an Indonesian professional footballer who plays as a winger or full-back for Liga 1 club Bali United.

International career
He made his debut for the Indonesia against Myanmar on 25 March 2019.

Career statistics

Club

International

International goals 
International under-23 goals

Honours

Club

Sriwijaya U-21
 Indonesia Super League U-21: 2012–13
Persija Jakarta
 Liga 1: 2018
 Indonesia President's Cup: 2018
Menpora Cup: 2021

References

External links
 
 

Living people
1993 births
People from Padang
Association football midfielders
Indonesian footballers
Liga 1 (Indonesia) players
Sriwijaya F.C. players
Persebaya Surabaya players
Persija Jakarta players
Bali United F.C. players
Footballers at the 2014 Asian Games
Indonesia youth international footballers
Asian Games competitors for Indonesia
Indonesia international footballers
Sportspeople from West Sumatra